Rohožník is a village in Malacky District in the Bratislava Region of western Slovakia close to the town of Malacky, northwest of Slovakia's capital Bratislava.

History
First historical record about the village is from book of Hungarian historian Carolus Péterffy "Sacra concilia ecclesiae Romano-inquistitae in regno Hungariae celebrata" from year 1397.

Geography
The village lies at an altitude of 201 metres and covers an area of 27.44 km2.

References

External links

 Official page
http://www.statistics.sk/mosmis/eng/run.html

Villages and municipalities in Malacky District